Donnie Thomas (March 12, 1953 – May 11, 2017) was an American football linebacker. He played for the New England Patriots in 1976 and for the Hamilton Tiger-Cats in 1977.

He died on May 11, 2017, in Michigan City, Indiana at age 64.

References

1953 births
2017 deaths
American football linebackers
Indiana Hoosiers football players
New England Patriots players
Hamilton Tiger-Cats players